Freuet euch des Lebens (Enjoy Life), Op. 340, is a Viennese waltz composed by Johann Strauss II. It was written for the Vienna Musikverein, and premiered at the new Musikverein building in Vienna in 1870.

Waltz 1

Influence
In the opening movement of his Ninth Symphony, Gustav Mahler quotes from this waltz.

Vienna New Year's Concert 
The waltz was played at these Vienna New Year's Concerts:
1947 – Josef Krips
1962 – Willi Boskovsky
1974 – Willi Boskovsky
1988 – Claudio Abbado
1997 – Riccardo Muti
2008 – Georges Prêtre
2012 – Mariss Jansons
2020 – Andris Nelsons

References

External links 

Waltzes by Johann Strauss II